Alaskaentomon is a genus of proturans in the family Acerentomidae.

Species
 Alaskaentomon condei Nosek, 1981
 Alaskaentomon fjellbergi Nosek, 1977

References

Protura